Untereisenbach ( or Eesbech) is a village in the commune of Hosingen, in northern Luxembourg.  , the village has a population of 217.

See also

 List of villages in Luxembourg

Hosingen
Villages in Luxembourg
Germany–Luxembourg border crossings